Caldanaerobius polysaccharolyticus is a Gram-positive thermophilic, anaerobic, non-spore-forming bacterium from the genus of Caldanaerobius which has been isolated from organic waste leachate from Hoopeston in the United States.

References

 

Thermoanaerobacterales
Bacteria described in 2001
Thermophiles
Anaerobes